ash-Shuhada (martyrs' triangle) is a Palestinian village in the West Bank, located 5 km Southwest of the city of Jenin in the northern West Bank. According to the Palestinian Central Bureau of Statistics, the town had a population of 1,738 inhabitants in mid-year 2006.

History
Just east of the modern village (at grid 1758/2041), large amounts of pottery sherds have been found, all dating to the Middle Bronze Age IIB.

In the wake of the 1948 Arab–Israeli War, and after the 1949 Armistice Agreements, Ash-Shuhada came under  Jordanian rule.

Since the Six-Day War in 1967, Ash-Shuhada has been under Israeli occupation.

Footnotes

Bibliography

External links
Welcome To The City of al-Shuhada
Survey of Western Palestine, Map 8: IAA, Wikimedia commons 

Villages in the West Bank
Jenin Governorate
Municipalities of the State of Palestine